Juan Alberto Cruz Murillo (born 24 June 1959) is a Honduran football midfielder who played for Honduras in the 1982 FIFA World Cup.

Club career
He also played for Pumas UNAH and Olimpia for whom he played in the 1987 CONCACAF Champions' Cup.

International career
Cruz represented Honduras in 2 FIFA World Cup qualification matches and played against Yugoslavia at the 1982 FIFA World Cup.

References

External links

1959 births
Living people
Association football midfielders
Honduran footballers
Honduras international footballers
1982 FIFA World Cup players
C.D. Olimpia players